One Thousand Ways to Make $1000 is a 1936 non-fiction book of personal finance by Frances Minaker. It gives specific examples of individuals who made enough money to start their own businesses by starting with as little as $5, and it encourages the reader to do the same.

The book inspired billionaire investor Warren Buffett to start earning money at the age of seven.

References

1936 non-fiction books